Exit is a 2000 French thriller film written and directed by Olivier Megaton. The film stars Patrick Fontana, Féodor Atkine, Serge Blumental, Clotilde Courau, Manuel Blanc and Jean-Michel Fête. The film was released on 12 July 2000 by ARP Sélection.

Plot
Stanislas Dobschnik's father dies when Stanislas is seven years old. His distraught mother is later put into psychiatric care and Stanislas is left with a foster family but maintains an obsession with his ailing mother, sitting outside her window for extended periods of time. Stanislas has regular visits with a psychologist, Professor Olbek, who believes that Stanislas has been wrongfully convicted out of prejudice due to his profile. He has the investigation opened again and the conviction overturned. When Stanislas is released, Olbek recommends a job on the night shift at a morgue. Stanislas is pleased with the position because he does not like to be around people. It also allows him time to focus on his work as a serial killer. He photographs his victims and meticulously collects evidence such as hair and murder weapons in plastic bags.

Cast       
Patrick Fontana as Le narrateur / Stan
Féodor Atkine as Olbek, le psychiatre
Serge Blumental as Léon / Le commissaire
Clotilde Courau as Pearl / La journaliste
Manuel Blanc as Junk
Jean-Michel Fête as Eric
Élodie Mennegand as Elodie

References

External links
 

2000 films
French thriller films
2000 thriller films
EuropaCorp films
Films directed by Olivier Megaton
French serial killer films
Films about psychiatry
2000s French-language films
2000s French films